Ile may refer to:

 iLe, a Puerto Rican singer
 Ile District (disambiguation), multiple places
 Ilé-Ifẹ̀, an ancient Yoruba city in south-western Nigeria
 Interlingue (ISO 639:ile), a planned language
 Isoleucine, an amino acid abbreviated as Ile or I
 Another name for Ilargi, the moon in Basque mythology
 Historical spelling of Islay, Scottish island and girls' name
 Another name for the Ili River in eastern Kazakhstan
 Ile, a gender-neutral pronoun in Portuguese

See also 
 ILE (disambiguation)